John McKenna (1855–1936) was an Irish businessman, rugby player, and first manager of Liverpool F.C.

John McKenna or MacKenna may also refer to:

Entertainment
 John McKenna (flautist) (1880–1947), Irish-American flautist
 John MacKenna (born 1952), Irish playwright and novelist
 John McKenna (sculptor) (born 1964), British/Scottish sculptor
 John McKenna (director), British TV director

Sports
 John McKenna (footballer) (1882–?), English footballer who played as a defender
 John McKenna (American football) (1914–2007), American football player, coach, and administrator
 John McKenna (hurler) (born 1938), Irish hurler
 Johnny McKenna (1926–1980), Irish footballer
 Jack McKenna, Irish darts player

Other
 John McKenna (usher) (1841–1898), Irish American civil servant; Chief Usher of the White House
 John or Juan Mackenna (1771–1814), Irishman hero of the Chilean War of Independence